Boeing Crew Flight Test (Boe CFT) will be the first crewed mission of the Boeing Starliner and the third orbital flight test of the Starliner overall after the two uncrewed flight tests, OFT-1 and OFT-2. Though the launch date for the mission was scheduled for late 2021, various delays have pushed the launch of the CFT mission to no earlier than April 2023. It will fly with a crew of two NASA astronauts to the International Space Station for a one-week test flight.

Capsule 
NASA announced that Boeing prepared to reassemble the vehicle for flight, following multiple checkouts, for the CFT mission in August 2020, and that new parachutes and airbags would be fitted. The CFT capsule's docking system has been modified to accommodate the new re-entry cover that debuted on the OFT-2 test flight.

Crew 
Nicole Aunapu Mann was initially assigned to this mission, which would have made her the first woman to fly on the maiden crewed flight of an orbital spacecraft, but was subsequently reassigned to the SpaceX Crew-5 mission as the first female commander of a NASA Commercial Crew Program launch. Due to medical reasons, Eric Boe, who was originally assigned to the mission in August 2018 as pilot was replaced by Michael Fincke on 22 January 2019. Boe will replace Fincke as the assistant to the chief for commercial crew in the astronaut office at NASA's Johnson Space Center. Boeing astronaut Chris Ferguson was originally assigned to the flight as commander, but he was replaced by NASA astronaut Barry Wilmore on 7 October 2020. Ferguson cited family reasons for the replacement. Matthew Dominick replaced him on the backup crew.

On 18 April 2022, NASA said that it had not finalized which of the cadre of Starliner astronauts, including Barry Wilmore, Michael Fincke, and Sunita Williams, will fly on this mission or the first operational Starliner mission. On 16 June 2022, NASA confirmed that this CFT mission will be a two-person flight test, consisting of Wilmore and Williams; Fincke is to train as the backup spacecraft test pilot and remains eligible for assignment to a future mission. Williams is expected to become the first woman to fly on the maiden crewed flight of an orbital spacecraft type (Judith Resnik was the first female crew member on the maiden flight of an orbital spacecraft, the Space Shuttle Discovery, followed by Kathryn Thornton on Endeavour, Shannon Walker on Crew Dragon Resilience, Kayla Barron on Endurance, and Samantha Cristoforetti and Jessica Watkins on Freedom).

Mission 
The third Atlas V N22 launch vehicle variant will launch Starliner with a crew of two. The vehicle will dock with the International Space Station, and return to Earth under parachutes for a ground-landing in the United States. Boeing teams continue refurbishing the crew module from the OFT-1 mission for the Crew Flight Test. This will be the first launch of a crewed spacecraft by an Atlas V launch vehicle. Based upon current space station resources and scheduling needs, a short duration mission with two astronaut test pilots is sufficient to meet all NASA and Boeing test objectives for CFT, which include demonstrating Starliner’s ability to safely fly operational crewed missions to and from the space station. To protect against unforeseen events with crew transportation to the station, NASA may extend the CFT docked duration up to six months and add an additional astronaut later, if needed.

See also 

 Commercial Crew Development
 SpaceX Dragon 2
 Crew Dragon Demo-2, SpaceX's first crewed mission of their capsule

References 

Boeing Starliner
2023 in spaceflight
Future human spaceflights
2023 in the United States